The FanTail is a Vertical Take-off and Landing (VTOL) Unmanned Air Vehicle developed by ST Aerospace.

A mock-up of the UAV made its first show appearance at Asian Aerospace 2006 in Singapore (21–25 February), along with the smaller original FanTail 3000 VTOL UAV, which has already flown about 100 hours.

Models

 FanTail 3000 (Prototype)
 Overall weight: 3 kg
 Payload weight: 0.9 kg
 Overall length: 76 cm
 Rotor diameter: 29 cm
 Width (excluding landing gear):
 Height(including landing gear):
 Maximum level speed in horizontal position:
 Endurance:
 Operating distance:
 Flight Control:
 Airframe: modular carbon-fibre composite construction
 Powerplant:
 Ground Control: Window notebook-based compact ground control station with datalink terminal
 FanTail 5000
 Overall weight: 5.5 kg
 Payload weight: 0.4 kg
 Overall length:
 Rotor diameter: 46 cm
 Width (excluding landing gear): 59 cm
 Height(including landing gear): 115 cm
 Maximum level speed in horizontal position: 60 Knot / 111 km/h
 Endurance: 30 minutes in hover
 Operating distance: 5 km
 Flight Control: pre-programmed autonomous waypoint navigation using GPS
 Airframe: modular carbon-fibre composite construction
 Powerplant: 3.5 hp two-stroke gasoline engine
 Ground Control: Window notebook-based compact ground control station with datalink terminal

See also

References
 ST Aerospace FanTail II
 Damian Kemp Jane's Aviation, AA 2006: FanTail 5000 prototype flight set for March, 20 February 2006
  FanTail VTOL Miniature UAV

Unmanned aerial vehicles of Singapore
FanTail
Airborne military robots
Military equipment of Singapore
Ducted fan-powered aircraft
Tailsitter aircraft